Steppenwolf is a fictional character in the DC Extended Universe film series, based on the supervillain of the same name from DC Comics and portrayed by actor Ciarán Hinds. First appearing in the Ultimate edition of Batman v Superman: Dawn of Justice as a hologram, the character makes his first live-action appearance in the theatrical release of the film Justice League. Steppenwolf is a demonic warlord from the planet Apokolips aiming to conquer Earth and its inhabitants. During the film's troubled production, the character was heavily redesigned by Joss Whedon, who had taken over directorial duties for Zack Snyder. This iteration of the character received negative reviews and was criticized as underwhelming and generic. Snyder's director's cut of the film depicts Steppenwolf as originally envisioned, with this portrayal of the character receiving greater praise.

Character development and design
The character of Steppenwolf originally appeared in 1972 as a New God associated with Darkseid and Apokolips in New Gods #7, and is traditionally a recurring villain against Superman and the Justice League. Prior to his inclusion in the DC Extended Universe, Steppenwolf briefly appeared in several works in the DC Animated Universe such as Superman: The Animated Series and the Justice League animated series, and later in other cartoons such as Batman: The Brave and the Bold and Justice League Action.

Suicide Squad director David Ayer revealed that Enchantress was originally the supporting villain in the film and was under the control of Steppenwolf via a Mother Box, but that this plot element was removed during pre-production, due to rewrites of Justice League, which originally had Darkseid as the main villain. Steppenwolf was then moved over to Justice League and replaced by Enchantress's brother Incubus in Suicide Squad, with Enchantress being made the primary antagonist.

Irish actor Ciarán Hinds was cast to portray Steppenwolf in Justice League through voice and motion capture. Hinds received advice from Liam Neeson (who had done similar motion capture work in A Monster Calls) for his performance.

During post-production of Zack Snyder's Justice League, which happened during the COVID-19 pandemic, several special effects studios were shut down or inaccessible, resulting in some unused visuals intended for the 2017 cut being unavailable and needing to be re-rendered. This included the rendering of Steppenwolf, who was "built from scratch" for the director's cut, also because the character had reverted to Zack Snyder's original design.

"Steppenwolf" is the German word for steppe wolf.

Differences between theatrical and director's cuts

Originally conceived as a monstrous, horned being with seven fingers on each hand and hooved feet, Steppenwolf was "toned down" during the troubled production of the film, as Warner Bros. deemed Zack Snyder's design as too intimidating. Joss Whedon's "sanitized" rendering of the character made him more humanoid and "self aware". He refers to the Mother Boxes as "Mother" and makes several "cheesy" quips in the film, and as described by Mark Birrell of Screen Rant, resembles a "Saturday-morning cartoon villain" who enjoys "being a bad guy" with Darkseid's role in the film being almost entirely scrapped.

Once the director's cut was greenlit, Steppenwolf was reverted back to his original, alien design, and was given new armor and gadgets. In addition, the character's relationships with Darkseid and DeSaad are explored, and his fight scenes are much more violent and emotional. Hinds described Steppenwolf as characterized in this version of the film as "old, tired" and trying to find a way to escape his role of servitude under Darkseid. He also speaks more "poetically" but overall less frequently, letting his violent actions speak for themselves. Snyder also adds that the character was designed with a "fallen angel" archetype, trying to regain his commander's good graces. His armor, in particular, was rendered by Weta Digital as a bevy of spikes that appear to move with the character's emotions and also follows his design as a "space knight". Anders Langlands, one of the supervisors at Weta, comments that "Zack had the idea that his armor would react to his mood and be part of his performance, as if it was some kind of alien technology that’s symbiotic with him."

Role in the films

Batman v Superman: Dawn of Justice

Steppenwolf first appears in the Ultimate Edition of the film as a hologram, appearing as he does in Zack Snyder's Justice League, as Lex Luthor is communicating with him at the Kryptonian scout ship prior to being arrested following Superman's death at the hands of Doomsday.

Justice League

Theatrical cut

As portrayed in the theatrical cut, Steppenwolf leads the first invasion of Earth thousands of years ago, but his forces are defeated by a united front of humans, Amazons, Atlanteans, Olympian Gods, and Green Lanterns. He is driven mad by his defeat and banished from Apokolips due to this failure. When the three Mother Boxes that he had used in his initial invasion attempt are reawakened in the present day following Superman's death, Steppenwolf returns to Earth in hopes of conquering it to regain Darkseid's favor, setting up his base in an abandoned city in Russia similar to Chernobyl. He effortlessly takes the boxes from the Amazons, Atlanteans, and later humans when the Justice League uses the final box to revive Superman and allow Steppenwolf to take it while distracted. In the final battle against the League, he handily fends off the League when they attempt to stop the Unity of the Mother Boxes, but is defeated by Superman which instills him with a new sense of fear, causing his army of Parademons to attack him and drag him through the boom tube back to Apokolips.

Director's cut

In the director's cut, Steppenwolf's nephew Darkseid leads the invasion of Earth instead. Steppenwolf was banished from Apokolips for attempting to betray Darkseid and seize his throne, and despite his change of heart, owes the latter a debt of one hundred and fifty-thousand worlds conquered before he can return to his home planet. After successfully claiming 100,000, he is called to Earth when the Mother Boxes, left behind by Darkseid following his failed invasion attempt aeons ago, are reactivated in the wake of Superman's death. Steppenwolf and his parademons first invade Themyscira and, after a bloody battle with the Amazons, defeats them and takes the Mother Box guarded by them. He uses the Box to gather radioactive material from the abandoned nuclear facility in Russia and create a barrier around his base, then starts torturing Atlantean guards and humans for information on the other two boxes. After obtaining the second box from Atlantis, he finds the fabled Anti-Life Equation that Darkseid seeks and reports his discovery to DeSaad. Darkseid gives Steppenwolf a chance at redemption by uniting the Mother Boxes to prepare for his arrival. The Justice League, led by Batman, initially prevents him from retrieving the final Mother Box. They use the box to revive Superman, knowing that Steppenwolf will inevitably sense and retrieve it once they do so, but S.T.A.R. Labs scientist Silas Stone superheats the box at the cost of his own life before Steppenwolf takes it, allowing Stone's son, Victor Stone / Cyborg, to track it to Russia.

Though the League breaks into the barrier and eliminates many of the parademons, Steppenwolf holds the League off when they try to prevent the Unity until Superman arrives and subdues him, burning off his right horn and damaging his armor. The Mother Boxes are nonetheless synchronized and Steppenwolf manages to terraform Earth for Darkseid, but The Flash taps into the Speed Force and reverses time to undo this. After Cyborg and Superman separate and disable the boxes the second time around, Aquaman impales the distracted and now-vulnerable Steppenwolf and Superman punches him towards the Boom Tube before Wonder Woman decapitates him, sending his corpse hurtling back to Apokolips. Darkseid crushes Steppenwolf's severed head in anger, pledging to return to Earth through the "old ways" for the Anti-Life Equation.

Reception

Steppenwolf's portrayal in the theatrical release of Justice League was ridiculed by critics and fans alike, with Screen Rant describing this rendition as "generic", "forgettable", and too "family friendly", stating that he bore too much resemblance to Thanos in the Marvel Cinematic Universe. His CGI design was also poorly received, which was partially attributed to the redesign of the character being pushed through late in production. Hinds also reportedly expressed frustration with the theatrical cut, which trimmed down much of his character's development and personality. However, Steppenwolf's depiction in the director's cut was much more warmly received by fans and critics, with praise directed at his monstrous and alien design, his more menacing and sinister presence, and his greater level of character depth and development in contrast to his theatrical counterpart. Specifically, Comic Book Resources commented that this latter version of the character was more believable as a credible threat to the protagonists. 

Sam Adams of Slate.com compared both versions of the character in an analysis of Zack Snyder's Justice League, noting the different portrayals of Steppenwolf as one of the key differences between the theatrical and director's cuts. Adams called Whedon's version "quippier and creepier", likening the character to "cosplaying Mike Pence" and criticizing his armor, which he likened to a generic medieval garb. He praised Snyder's version for a "truly stellar" armor and more fearsome demeanor, but also called him more "pathetic" due to his desperation to regain Darkseid's favor.

See also
Characters of the DC Extended Universe

Notes

References
 The plot description and characterization were adapted from Steppenwolf, Justice League (film), and Zack Snyder's Justice League (film) at DC Extended Universe Wiki, which are available under a Creative Commons Attribution-Share Alike 3.0 license.

Action film villains
Characters created by Zack Snyder
DC Comics deities
DC Comics characters who can move at superhuman speeds
DC Comics characters with superhuman strength
Male film villains
DC Comics extraterrestrial supervillains
DC Comics military personnel
DC Extended Universe characters
Demons in popular culture
Fictional axefighters
Fictional generals
Fictional mass murderers
Fictional torturers and interrogators
Fictional warlords
Film characters introduced in 2016
Film supervillains
Male characters in film
New Gods of Apokolips